Newton Township is a township in Jasper County, Iowa, USA.

History
Newton Township was established in 1851.

References

Townships in Jasper County, Iowa
Townships in Iowa
1851 establishments in Iowa
Populated places established in 1851